Benoît Vermander (born 1960), also known as Wei Mingde and Bendu, is a French Jesuit, sinologist, political scientist, and painter. He is currently professor of religious sciences at Fudan University, Shanghai, as well as academic director of the Xu-Ricci Dialogue Center within the University. He has been director of the  Taipei Ricci Institute from 1996 to 2009 and the editor-in-chief of its electronic magazine erenlai. He is also consultor to the Pontifical Council for Inter-religious Dialogue. He holds a M.Phil in political science from Yale University, a doctorate in the same discipline from Institut d’Etudes Politiques de Paris, a Master of Sacred Theology from Fu Jen Catholic University (Taiwan) and a Doctorate in Sacred Theology from the Jesuit Faculties of Philosophy and Theology of Paris (Centre Sevres).

His research and publications focus on China's model of development and its role in the globalization process, on Chinese religions and spiritual traditions, as well as on the role and status of traditional wisdom, rituals, and civil religion in contemporary societies.

China's model of development and role in globalization
He has highlighted and analyzed the systemic relationship between globalization and the rise of China (La Chine ou le temps retrouvé, les figures de la mondialisation et l’ascension chinoise, Academia-Bruyant, 2008 ). He has enlarged this research to the external and internal factors explaining the rise of Corporate Social Responsibility in China (Corporate Social responsibility in China, World Scientific, 2014).

His research on the effect of globalization on the Chinese local fabric has also given rise to a case-study on Liangshan Yi Autonomous Prefecture, Sichuan (L’Enclos à moutons, Les Indes savantes, 2007). This case-study was linked to an ongoing local developmental project led together with Professor Stevan Harrell, University of Washington, and a group of Yi scholars.

Chinese religions and spiritualities
Under his Chinese name Wei Mingde, he has published several books in China and Taiwan, some of which are translated from French or English.

Several of his publications deal with the transformations of the Chinese religious landscape and the way Christianity contributes to them while being affected by the trends that redefine China's self-understanding of its cultural tradition (Shanghai Sacred, 2018; Le Christ Chinois, DDB, 1998; Les mandariniers de la rivière Huai, DDB, 2002; L’Empire sans milieu, DDB, 2010). In the latter book and several articles he analyzes how China's religious revival goes along the redefinition of the traditional Chinese religious psyche and societal forms.  He also writes on the spiritual dimension of Chinese ancient philosophy and the way its re-interpretation may enrich today's spiritual quest in interreligious perspective. In Shanghai Sacred, published in collaboration with Liz Hingley and Liang Zhang, he combines the study of Chinese religions in urban settings with the one of the current expressions of Chinese 'civil religions.'

This research on the genealogy and expression of civil religions is continued, in different context, in Versailles, la République et la Nation, centered on evolving expressions of social sacrality in comparative perspective.  In the same line, he has written several contribution on the current trend of “religious sinicization” as well as on China-Vatican relationships.

At the same time, he also focuses on the spiritual dimension of ancient Chinese philosophy and how its reinterpretation can enrich the contemporary spiritual quest in an interreligious perspective. His book Comment lire les classiques chinois ? (How to read the Chinese classics?) shows the organic unity of the corpus constituted by ancient Chinese classics, built around a reflexive apprehension of our bodily experiences, and traces the way to a shared reading of the classics around which humankind gathers.

Wisdoms, classics and rituals
In several contributions he crossed the study of classical texts with that of rituals and modes of governance of local societies, notably in several Asian contexts, bringing to light the "wisdoms" that the practices of these societies still harbour. This study of the intersections of classics, wisdoms and rituals focuses in particular on the study of civilizational complexes formed around cereal cultures.

Art
Under the art name Bendu, he also creates works of Chinese painting and calligraphy. He studied under the Sichuanese painter Li Jinyuan. In concert with Li Jinyuan, he held expositions at the Réfectoire des Jacobins (Toulouse, 1996), the European Parliament (Strasbourg, 1996), the National Gallery (Beijing, 1997) and Gallery of Sichuan (Chengdu, 1997). He has held solo exhibitions at Fu Jen University (Taipei, 1993), University of San Francisco (1999), The French Institute in Taipei (2002), Chengdu's Academy of Painting and Calligraphy (2002), Beida Centre (Tainan, 2004), Kwanghua Centre (Hong Kong, 2005), the Tibeto-Mongolian Foundation (Taipei, 2008), Sunbow Gallery  (Shanghai, 2008), Xuhui Art Museum (Shanghai, 2014), Open Space Gallery in Shanghai (2017), Ancienne Banque de France in Lens, North of France (2019) and ICICLE Space in Shanghai (2022) amongst various other places. In January 2023, his paintings are featured in the opening of the bookshop-gallery "Book Maoxiang" in Suzhou. He has published several collections of poems and paintings, in both Taiwan and China.

His art is characterized by the use of audacious calligraphic strokes, the influence of the landscapes and patterns of Tibeto-Burman ethnic groups in south western China and the blending of traditions and techniques.

Some of his works can be seen at this virtual gallery.

Artworks
 The Art of Observing Water / 观水有术. Shanghai, ICICLE Space, 2022.
 Light in the Night. A Dialogue on Art, Philosophy and life between Li Shuang and Benoît Vermander, Shanghai, Shanghai Literature and Art Press, 2019.
 Seeing the Mountain, Drawing the City (with Liang Zhun), Shanghai, Xuhui Art Museum, 2014.
 Taiwan's Color Code (photos albums, bilingual Chinese-English), Shanghai, AZ Cultural Enterprise, 2010.
 Senlin zhong de banmangren (Half-Blind in the Forest), Shanghai, Sunbow Gallery, 2008.
 Youmu jiyi  (Nomadic Memory), Taipei, Renlai, 2008.
 Les deux nuits de Jacob (poetry and paintings, French and Chinese), Taipei, Taipei Ricci Institute, 2002.
 Tianlu licheng (Pilgrim's Progress), in collaboration with Li Jinyuan, Sichuan People's Art Press, 1997.
 Chuangsheji (Genesis), Hsinchuang, Fu Jen Faculty of Theology, 1995.

Distinctions
 Corbay Prize (2022), awarded by the Académie des Sciences Morales et Politiques for L'Homme et le grain. Une histoire céréalière des civilisations (Les Belles Lettres).
 Winner of the Annual Best Essay Award delivered by Dao, A Journal of Comparative Philosophy. 
 He has been selected in October 2014 as one of the 50 personalities having most influenced the dialogue between China and France in the last 50 years  
 Knight in the Ordre des Palmes académiques
 Auguste Pavie Prize (2013) awarded by Académie des Sciences d’Outremer for “Les Jésuites et la Chine”
 Albert Thibaudet Prize (2011) for “L’Empire sans Milieu”

Selected publications
 Les Exercices Spirituels d’Ignace de Loyola. Une version contemporaine. Paris : Editions Jésuites, 2022 
 Comment lire les classiques chinois ? Paris, Les Belles Lettres, 2022, 
 L’Homme et le grain. Une histoire céréalière des civilisations, Alain Bonjean and Benoît Vermander, Paris, Les Belles Lettres, 2021. 
 Cereals, Rituals, and Social Structure, In Oxford Research Encyclopedia of Anthropology. Oxford University Press, 2018. Article published April 26, 2021. 
 《詮釋三角。漢學、比較經學與跨文化神學的形成與互動》[The Hermeneutical Triangle: The Formation and Interaction of Sinology, Comparative Classics and Cross-cultural Theology] 謝華、沈秀臻、魯進、陳文飛 譯。 台北： 台北利氏學社， 2021 , 367 p. Mainland China edition : 诠释三角：汉学、比较经学与跨文化神学的形成与互动; Fudan University Press, 2022.   
 Que cette demeure est donc précaire ! De Chine, penser en pandémie, Paris, Lessius, 2020 
 Versailles, la République et la Nation, Paris, Les Belles Lettres, 2018
 Shanghai Sacred. The religious landscape of a global city (with Liz Hingley and Liang Zhang), Seattle University of Washington Press, 2018.
 Dancing over the Bridge. Cross-cultural Dialogue and Encounters (wu zai qiao shang, kuawenhua xinagyu yu duihua, en Chinois), (in collaboration with Lu Jin), Beijing, Peking University Press, 2016.
 Culture et Spiritualité (wenhua yu lingixng, en Chinois) (edited with Claire Shen Xiuzhen), Shanghai, Zhongxi shuju, 2016.
 Corporate Social Responsibility in China: A Vision, an Assessment and a Blueprint, World Scientific, Singapore, 2014.
 Les Jésuites et la Chine, Bruxelles, Lessius, 2012.
 Dialogue as a game (duihua ru youxi), Beijing, Beijing Commercial Press, 2012.(in Chinese)
 A reader of Ancient Roman Religion (gu luoma zongjiao duben), with WU Yaling, Beijing, Beijing Commercial Pres, 2012. (in Chinese)
 L'Empire sans milieu, essai sur la 'sortie de la religion' en Chine, DDB, Paris, 2010.
 Shamanism and Christianity: Religious Encounter among Indigenous Peoples of East Asia (edited by Olivier Lardinois and Benoît Vermander). Taipei, Taipei Ricci Institute, 2008.
 La Chine ou le temps retrouvé, les figures de la mondialisation et l’ascension chinoise. Louvain, Academia-Bruyant, 2008.
 Chine brune ou Chine verte, les dilemmes de l’Etat-parti. Paris, Presses de Sciences Po, 2007.
 Sagesse chinoise et méditation chrétienne. Paris, Arsis, 2007.
 L’enclos à moutons, un village nuosu au sud-ouest de la Chine. Paris, Les Indes savantes, 2007.
 La Chine en quête de ses frontières, le conflit Chine-Taiwan (en collaboration avec Jean-Pierre Cabestan), Paris, Presses de Sciences Po, 2005
 Creeds, Rites and Videotapes: Narrating religious experience in East Asia, edited by Elise Anne DeVido and Benoit Vermander, Taipei, Taipei Ricci Institute, 2004.
 Environmental Protection and Humanist Wisdom (edited by Tyl, D., Vermander, B.). Taipei, Kuangchi Cultural Enterprise, 2002. (in Chinese)
 Peace Education. (ed.), Taipei, Kuangchi Cultural Enterprise, 2001. (in Chinese)
 Les mandariniers de la rivière Huai, le réveil religieux de la Chine, Paris, DDB, 2002
 Conflict and Reconciliation: Peace Culture in Taiwan, Taipei, Li-hsü publishing house, 2000. (in Chinese)
 Heart of Heaven and Heart of Man (edited by Fuxing, D., Shen, V., Vermander, B.). Taipei, Li-hsü publishing house, 1999. (in Chinese)
 Harmony, Exchange and Conflict (edited by Vermander, B.). Chengdu, Sichuan People's  publishing house, 1999. (in Chinese)
 Le Christ chinois, héritages et espérance (sous la direction de B. Vermander), Paris, DDB, 1998.
 Violence and Politics. Hsinchuang, FuJen University Press, 1995. (in Chinese)

References

External links
 Bibliography
 Xu-Ricci Dialogue Institute
 Interreligious Dialogue in Asia: A look at the past to understand the future January 2019
 The Birth of a Pan-Asian Theology: Under the sign of harmony
 Video interview on The Roundtable Perspective
 An article of Benoît Vermander published in “The Way”: “Exile and Virtual Space: The New Frontiers in Interreligous Dialogue”
 Benoît Vermander's speech during a conference on communication in Taipei (2009)
 eRenlai Magazine website
 An article of Bendu about his ink paintings
  Bendu's poems on the Pescadores Archipelago
 A short film of Bendu : 'Good morning Changxi village !'

French political scientists
1960 births
Living people
20th-century French Jesuits
21st-century French Jesuits
French sinologists
French male writers
Academic staff of Fudan University
Yale Graduate School of Arts and Sciences alumni
Fu Jen Catholic University alumni
20th-century French painters
French expatriates in China
21st-century French painters